Sergei Aslanovich Beshukov (born April 1, 1971) is a Russian chess player. He obtained the International Master (IM) title in 1992 and grandmaster (GM) title in 1994, and is a FIDE Arbiter (2018) and International Organizer (2019).

Notable Tournaments

References 

1971 births
Russian chess players
Living people
Chess grandmasters

20th-century chess players
21st-century chess players